The Norton Reservoir is a lake/reservoir/pond within the towns of Norton and Mansfield, in southeastern Massachusetts. The Rumford River empties out into the reservoir.

External links

 http://www.mass.gov/dfwele/dfw/habitat/maps/ponds/pdf/dfwnorto.pdf

A 1982 survey showed that white perch were most common. Also found were chain pickerel, largehmouth bass, black crappie, golden shiners, pumpkinseed, yellow perch, bluegill, and bullheads. Tiger muskies and northern pike have also been added.

Taunton River watershed
Lakes of Bristol County, Massachusetts
Reservoirs in Massachusetts
Protected areas of Bristol County, Massachusetts